A driver's manual is a book created by the DMV of a corresponding state in order to give information to people about the state's driving laws. This can include information such as how to get a license, license renewal, road laws, driving restrictions, etc. "In the U.S. there is no central organization that is responsible for the creation of Driver's Manuals." (Idaho Driver's Manual). As a result, there is no set of rules for the states to create the manuals, so all driver's manuals vary by state. However, every state does still follow general guidelines when creating the manuals.

The beginning of every manual starts with how to get a driver's license. It informs us about what types of identification is needed, and who is eligible to apply for a license. In most states, you "must provide documentary proof of their full legal name, age, Social Security number, citizenship, or legal presence and address." (Ohio Driver's Manual). In all states there is a minimum age requirement for getting a driver's permit, which later leads into receiving a full driver's license. This age limit varies by state. "The person must also be in good general health, and can have good vision with or without glasses or contacts."(New Jersey Driver's Manual). There is also usually a payment fee in order to receive your license. Along with getting a license, all states also offer voter registration and becoming an organ donor when applying for your license. Every state requires taking a written test to receive your driver's permit. Every state also requires a driver's test that you must pass in order to get your license. However, only a few of the states' manuals actually go into detail about what exactly they will test you on for the driving test. All manuals proceed to talk about the specifics of how to drive and the rules of the road.

Every manual includes a section that goes into detail about car and driver safety. All states require vehicle inspection, but only some require annual inspection. Driving while intoxicated is illegal in the United States. Almost all states have a "minimum blood alcohol level while driving of .08%" (Kentucky Driver's Manual). For seat belts, 49 states and the District of Columbia have passed laws requiring seat belt use by at least all occupants of the front seat. New Hampshire is the only state with no such requirement for adults. However, in all states anyone under the age of 18 is required to wear a seat belt. Vehicles must always make way for emergency vehicles.

See also
The Highway Code, the equivalent guide in the United Kingdom
Malta's The Highway Code, the equivalent guide in Malta
Road Users' Code, the equivalent guide in Hong Kong

References 

Automotive safety
Road user guides